Christian Bolaños Navarro (born 17 May 1984) is a Costa Rican professional footballer who plays as a winger for Liga FPD club Saprissa. Since his international debut in 2005, Bolaños has earned over 80 international caps and played at three FIFA World Cups.

His brother Jonathan is also a footballer.

Club career

Deportivo Saprissa
With Saprissa Bolaños won various national championships as well as a UNCAF Cup title and a CONCACAF Champions Cup title. Bolaños participated in the 2005 FIFA Club World Championship Toyota Cup with his team, and was awarded by FIFA as the third best player of the tournament. Following this success he was invited to attend a ten-day trial with Liverpool, although he was not signed on a permanent basis.

On 9 August 2006, he signed a one-year loan deal with Premier League side Charlton Athletic. However, he failed to obtain a work permit having not played enough games for his country, and the deal fell through.

OB
On 2 June 2007, he signed a three-year contract with the Danish side OB in the top-flight Danish Superliga championship. Struggling to make an impact on the strong Danish midfield, Bolaños was a target for other clubs.

Start
On 6 November 2008, he signed a contract with newly promoted Norwegian side Start starting 1 January 2009.

In IK Start's first test against a Tippeligaen side, Bolaños received rave reviews from the media after outplaying Norwegian international Trond Erik Bertelsen of Viking, who a few days earlier had controlled Bastian Schweinsteiger during Norway's win against Germany. Start coach Knut Tørum said after the game that he will be playing on the right wing during the 2009 season. In his first official match for Start, Bolaños scored two goals against Strømsgodset.

FC Copenhagen
On 30 August 2010, he signed a three-year contract with the defending champions of Denmark, FC Copenhagen at a cost of 1 mill. euros, or 7,5 mio. DK kroner.

On 22 August 2012, Bolaños was linked with a £3 million move to English side Wolverhampton Wanderers, which could re-unite him with former Copenhagen manager Ståle Solbakken.

Cartaginés
On 8 September 2014, he signed with Cartaginés, only to leave them for Qatari side Al Gharafa after the winter championship.

Vancouver Whitecaps FC
On 20 January 2016, he signed a multi-year contract with Vancouver Whitecaps FC of Major League Soccer for an undisclosed amount.

Saprissa
Following two years with Vancouver, Bolaños returned to Saprissa again after his option was declined following the 2017 season.

International career
He played in the 2001 FIFA U-17 World Championship held in Trinidad and Tobago.

He made his debut for the senior national team in a May 2005 friendly match against Norway and has, as of November 2016, collected a total of 71 caps, scoring 6 goals. He has represented his country in 25 FIFA World Cup qualification matches and played at both the 2006 FIFA World Cup and the 2014 FIFA World Cup as well as at the 2005, 2007 and 2011 CONCACAF Gold Cups.

In May 2018 he was named in Costa Rica's 23 man squad for the 2018 FIFA World Cup in Russia. By entering as a substitute in the first matchday defeat against Serbia, Bolaños became the only Costa Rican to play at three different FIFA World Cups, and overtook Michael Umaña as the Costa Rican with most matches played at the competition.

Career statistics

Club

International

International goals
 Scores and results list Costa Rica's goal tally first.

Honours
Saprissa
 Primera División winner: 2003–04, 2005–06, 2006–07
 Costa Rican short championship winner: 2003–04 Apertura, 2005–06 Apertura, 2005–06 Clausura, 2006–07 Apertura, 2006–07 Clausura, 2015–16 Apertura, 2017–18 Clausura, 2019–20 Clausura, 2020–21 Clausura
 FIFA Club World Cup third place: 2005
 CONCACAF Champions League winner: 2005
 runner-up: 2004
 Copa Interclubes UNCAF winner: 2003
 runner-up: 2007

Copenhagen
 Danish Superliga: 2010–11, 2012–13
 Danish Cup: 2011–12

Individual
 FIFA Club World Cup Bronze Ball: 2005
 CONCACAF Best XI: 2016

References

External links

1984 births
Living people
Footballers from San José, Costa Rica
Association football midfielders
Costa Rican footballers
Costa Rica international footballers
2005 CONCACAF Gold Cup players
2006 FIFA World Cup players
2007 CONCACAF Gold Cup players
2011 CONCACAF Gold Cup players
2014 FIFA World Cup players
Copa América Centenario players
2018 FIFA World Cup players
Deportivo Saprissa players
Odense Boldklub players
IK Start players
F.C. Copenhagen players
C.S. Cartaginés players
Al-Gharafa SC players
Vancouver Whitecaps FC players
Liga FPD players
Danish Superliga players
Eliteserien players
Qatar Stars League players
Major League Soccer players
Costa Rican expatriate footballers
Expatriate men's footballers in Denmark
Expatriate footballers in Norway
Expatriate footballers in Qatar
Expatriate soccer players in Canada
Costa Rican expatriate sportspeople in Denmark
Costa Rican expatriate sportspeople in Norway
Costa Rican expatriate sportspeople in Qatar
Costa Rican expatriate sportspeople in Canada
2019 CONCACAF Gold Cup players